Brie-Comte-Robert is a commune in the Seine-et-Marne department in the Île-de-France region in north-central France.

Brie-Comte-Robert is on the edge of the plain of Brie and was formerly the capital of the Brie française.

"Brie" comes from the Gaulish briga, meaning "plateau".
The "Comte Robert" was Robert I of Dreux who owned the town and was a brother of the King Louis VII.

Population
The inhabitants are called Briards.

Sights
 The medieval castle

 Église Saint-Étienne: (13th century) Gothic church, with its original rose window above the quire, wood panels of the 15th century.
 Hôtel-Dieu: (13th century) this place has been a hospital, then a nunnery. A recent building has been built, using the original facade of the chapel.
 A stunning market place with beautiful fruit and vegetables arranged almost like art

See also
 Villemeneux
 Communes of the Seine-et-Marne department
 Market place

References

External links

 1999 Land Use, from IAURIF (Institute for Urban Planning and Development of the Paris-Île-de-France région) 
 

 
Communes of Seine-et-Marne